Halfday Creek is a stream in Jackson County, Kansas and Shawnee County, Kansas, in the United States.

Halfday Creek was named for a Potawatomi chief.

See also
List of rivers of Kansas

References

Rivers of Jackson County, Kansas
Rivers of Shawnee County, Kansas
Rivers of Kansas